The Kranji Expressway (Abbreviation: KJE) in Singapore connects from the BKE in Bukit Panjang and travels south-west to join with the PIE in Jurong West. Construction of the expressway started in 1990 and was completed in 1994.

History
The new expressway was announced in 1990. It passes through the housing estates in Jurong, Choa Chu Kang and Bukit Panjang, ending near the subzone of Kranji. 

It was completed in six stages. One of the most difficult jobs in laying the expressway was the clearing of large granite for which 300 kg of explosives were used. It had five different construction contracts. The entire network of linking roads came about by the construction of a highway connecting PIE at Hong Kah and BKE at Zhenghua. It was inaugurated on 4 March 1995 by Lim Hng Kiang.

It replaces some roads - Hong Kah Road, Hong Kah Lane, Jalan Beka, Jalan Pelawan, Jalan Jelawi, Jalan Dedali, Lorong Merawan, Lorong Kerubut, Jalan Beras, Jalan Bungar, Jalan Buey, part of Jalan Sabit, Lorong Puyu, Lorong Dengkes, Jalan Ara, Jalan Chapa, Lorong Jelubu and Kadlin Lane.

List of exits
{| class="wikitable"
|-
! scope="col" | Exit
! scope="col" | Destinations
! scope="col" | Notes
|-
|1
|Bukit Timah Expressway (Pan Island Expressway, Woodlands)
|
|- 
| 1A
| Senja Road
|-
| 2
| Woodlands Road
| 
|-
| 3
| Choa Chu Kang Drive and Choa Chu Kang Way
| Signed as exit 4 eastbound
|-
| 5
| Brickland Road, Sungei Tengah Road, Old Choa Chu Kang Road
| 
|-
| 7
| Pan Island Expressway (Changi Airport, Tuas)

References

External links

Expressways in Singapore
Bukit Panjang
Choa Chu Kang
Sungei Kadut
Tengah
Western Water Catchment